Henricus generosus is a species of moth of the family Tortricidae. It is found in Ecuador (Carchi Province, Napo Province).

References

Moths described in 1994
Henricus (moth)